The Château de Lanmary is a château in Antonne-et-Trigonant, Dordogne, Nouvelle-Aquitaine, France, constructed around four 15th-century towers.

Gallery

See also
 List of castles in France

References 

Châteaux in Dordogne